Bünzen may refer to the following places:

in Switzerland
 Bünzen, Aargau, in the Canton of Aargau

in Germany
 Bünzen, Germany, a locality of Aukrug, Schleswig-Holstein